Platambus is a genus of beetle native to the Palearctic, including Europe, the Near East and North Africa. It distinguished by a wide epipleuron. The ventral surface has spot markings.

It contains the following species:

 Platambus americanus (Aubé, 1838)
 Platambus angulicollis (Régimbart, 1899)
 Platambus apache (Young, 1981)
 Platambus astrictovittatus (Larson & Wolfe, 1998)
 Platambus ater (Falkenström, 1936)
 Platambus aztec (Larson, 2000)
 Platambus balfourbrownei Vazirani, 1965
 Platambus biswasi Vazirani, 1965
 Platambus confusus (Blatchley, 1910)
 Platambus coriaceus (Régimbart, 1899)
 Platambus dabieshanensis Nilsson, 2003
 Platambus dembickyi Brancucci, 2006
 Platambus denticulatus Nilsson, 2003
 Platambus excoffieri Régimbart, 1899
 Platambus fimbriatus Sharp, 1884
 Platambus flavovittatus (Larson & Wolfe, 1998)
 Platambus fletcheri Zimmermann, 1928
 Platambus glabrellus (Motschulsky, 1859)
 Platambus guttulus (Régimbart, 1899)
 Platambus heteronychus Nilsson, 2003
 Platambus ikedai (Nilsson, 1997)
 Platambus incrassatus Gschwendtner, 1935
 Platambus insolitus (Sharp, 1884)
 Platambus johannis (Fall, 1922)
 Platambus kempi (Vazirani, 1970)
 Platambus khukri Brancucci, 1990
 Platambus koreanus (Nilsson, 1997)
 Platambus lindbergi Guéorguiev, 1963
 Platambus lineatus Gschwendtner, 1935
 Platambus lunulatus (Fischer von Waldheim, 1829)
 Platambus maculatus (Linnaeus, 1758)
 Platambus maya (Larson, 2000)
 Platambus mexicanus (Larson, 2000)
 Platambus micropunctatus Nilsson, 2003
 Platambus nepalensis (Guéorguiev, 1968)
 Platambus obtusatus (Say, 1823)
 Platambus optatus (Sharp, 1884)
 Platambus pictipennis (Sharp, 1873)
 Platambus planatus (Sharp, 1882)
 Platambus princeps (Régimbart, 1888)
 Platambus punctatipennis Brancucci, 1984
 Platambus regulae Brancucci, 1991
 Platambus satoi Brancucci, 1982
 Platambus sawadai (Kamiya, 1932)
 Platambus schaefleini Brancucci, 1988
 Platambus schillhammeri Wewalka & Brancucci, 1995
 Platambus sculpturellus (Zimmermann, 1919)
 Platambus semenowi (Jakovlev, 1897)
 Platambus semivittatus (LeConte, 1852)
 Platambus sogdianus (Jakovlev, 1897)
 Platambus spinipes (Sharp, 1882)
 Platambus stagninus (Say, 1823)
 Platambus strbai Hendrich & Balke, 1998
 Platambus striatus (Zeng & Pu, 1992)
 Platambus stygius (Régimbart, 1899)
 Platambus texovittatus (Larson & Wolfe, 1998)
 Platambus ussuriensis (Nilsson, 1997)
 Platambus wangi Brancucci, 2006
 Platambus wewalkai Brancucci, 1982
 Platambus wittmeri Wewalka, 1975
 Platambus wulingshanensis Brancucci, 2005
 Platambus yaanensis Nilsson, 2003

External links
Platambus at Fauna Europaea

Footnotes

Dytiscidae